The 2009 African Junior Athletics Championships were held in Bambous, Mauritius from 30 July to 2 August. There were 40 events in total, of which 20 were contested by male athletes and 20 by female athletes. Multiple gold medallists Caster Semenya and Amaka Ogoegbunam broke championships records, but also created controversy at the 2009 World Championships in Athletics later that year. Semenya was asked to take a gender test and Ogoegbunam tested positive for anabolic steroids.

Records

Medal summary

Men

Women

Medal table

References
General
Ouma, Mark (2009-07-30). Ndiku and Cherono prevail - African junior champs, Day 1. IAAF. Retrieved on 2016-07-30.
Ouma, Mark (2009-07-31). South African teen Semenya stuns with 1:56.72 800m World lead in Bambous - African junior champs, Day 2. IAAF. Retrieved on 2016-07-30.
Ouma, Mark (2009-08-01). More championship record fall in Bambous - African junior champs, Day 3. IAAF. Retrieved on 2016-07-30.
Ouma, Mark (2009-07-30). Back-to-back double for Ogoegbunam in Bambous - African junior champs, Day 4. IAAF. Retrieved on 2016-07-30.
2009 Africa Junior Athletics Championships – Full results. African Athletics (2009-08-02). Retrieved on 2009-09-30.

Specific

External links
African Athletics articles

African Junior Athletics Championships
African Junior Athletics Championships, 2009
Bambous, Mauritius
African Junior Athletics Championships, 2009
African Junior Athletics
International athletics competitions hosted by Mauritius
2009 in youth sport